Abalos is a surname. People with this surname include:

 Benjamin Abalos (born 1935), Filipino politician
 Benjamin Abalos Jr. (born 1962), Filipino politician and son of the above
 Carmelita Abalos (born 1962), Filipino politician, wife of Benjamin Abalos Jr., and current mayor of Mandaluyong
 Coraje Ábalos (born 1972), Argentine actor
 Iñaki Ábalos (born 1956), Spanish architect and author
 Jason Abalos (born 1986), Filipino actor.
 Jing Abalos (born 1941), Filipino film actor
 José Luis Ábalos (born 1959), Spanish politician
 Rafael Ábalos (born 1956), Spanish fantasy author

See also
 Ábalos, municipality in La Rioja, Spain
 Abalos & Herreros, Spanish architectural firm 
 Abalos Undae, a dune field on Mars